Ticonderoga Pulp and Paper Company Office is a historic office building located at Ticonderoga in Essex County, New York.  It was built in 1888 and is a rectangular, two story structure of brick laid in common bond with a rectangular brick addition built about 1910.  Both sections have gray slate gable roofs, white painted wood trim, and a denticulated brick cornice.  The company was organized in 1877 by Clayton H. Delano, whose house is also listed on the register.

It was listed on the National Register of Historic Places in 1988.

The building now houses the Ticonderoga Heritage Museum which share the industrial heritage of the area with visitors. It is also the visitors information center for the town.

References

External links
Ticonderoga Heritage Museum website

Commercial buildings on the National Register of Historic Places in New York (state)
Office buildings completed in 1888
Buildings and structures in Essex County, New York
National Register of Historic Places in Essex County, New York